The United Hospitals Athletics Club is a historic athletics club that used to host the annual United Hospitals athletics competition. Since the disbanding of the club, London Universities and Colleges Athletics has organised the competition within the LUCA Indoor Championships. The competition has been held since 1867.

History
The club was formed on 31 May 1867 at the West Brompton running grounds. The club was set up by Mr. S. Edwin Jolly who held the position of treasurer during the early years of the club. The events held on 11 and 12 June 1869 at Beaufort House included; Flat Race 100 yards, Flat Race 250 yards, Flat Race 880 yards, Flat Race One Mile, Flat Race 2 miles, Hurdle Race 120 yards, Hurdle Race 440 yards, High Jump, Long Jump, Throwing the Hammer, Throwing the Cricket Ball, Putting the Stone, Three Legged Race and Consolation Race 250 yards. King's, Guy's, London, St Thomas's, University College, St George's and St Mary's Medical Schools took part. For the fourth annual meeting in 1870 the event had to be moved to cater for a crowd of over 3000 spectators to the A.A.C Grounds, Lillie Bridge with 127 entries across all the different races.
The first presidents of the club were highly esteemed physicians and surgeons, Sir William Fergusson 1867, Sir Thomas Watson 1868 and Sir William Jenner 1869. The club required a physician and surgeon from each participating hospital to serve as vice-presidents of the club, this secured funding for the various prizes and ensured its continuation from year to year.
By the end of the 19th century the club held events at Stamford Bridge

United Hospitals Athletics Shield

The shield is given to the medical school with the largest number of points at the end of the annual event. The shield has been awarded since 1867. It is believed to be an electroplated copy of the Milton Shield, depicting scenes from John Milton's Paradise Lost. The current holders of the shield are St George's Hospital AC. Medals were also awarded to winning competitors, but are no longer handed out.

Present state
The status and quality of the individual medical schools teams has varied considerably since their individual inception dates. Since the United Hospitals Athletics Club was formed, the institutions that are represented by the member teams have been through considerable change, and hand-in-hand with these changes in the institutions have been changes in the teams that represent them. Thus all of the teams except St George's are formed of more than one of the historical London medical schools. Furthermore, after being proposed for membership in 2008, The Royal Veterinary College officially joined the United Hospitals in 2009.

The club no longer exists as a functioning athletics club, but the shield is still awarded at the United Hospitals Athletics Championships. This event has been incorporated into the LUCA Indoor Championships  and is awarded by LUCA.

The Bannister Cup, named after St Mary's Hospital alumnus Sir Roger Bannister, is the United Hospitals Cross Country Championships and is awarded at the third LUCA race held at Wimbledon Common in November. Scoring teams consist of the first three men and first two women from each university. The current holders are St George's Hospital AC.

Members

Shield winners

1867	Guy's

1868	St George's

1869	King's

1870	King's

1871	Guy's

1872	Guy's

1873	Barts

1874	King's

1875	St George's

1876	St George's

1877	Guy's

1878	Guy's

1879	St Thomas's

1880	St Thomas's

1881	St Thomas's

1882	St Thomas's

1883	St Thomas's

1884	London

1885	Barts

1886	Barts

1887	Barts

1888	Barts

1889	Barts

1890	Barts

1891	Barts

1892	Guy's

1893	Guy's

1894	Barts

1895	Guy's

1896	St Mary's

1897	St Mary's

1898	St Mary's

1899	Barts

1900	St Mary's

1901	Barts

1902	Barts

1903	Barts

1904	London

1905	London

1906	London

1907	London

1908	Barts

1909	London

1910	London St Thomas

1911	London

1912	London

1913	London

1914	London

1915	

1916	

1917	

1918	

1919	

1920	Guy's

1921	King's

1922	Guy's

1923	Barts

1924	Guy's

1925	Barts

1926	Guy's

1927	Guy's

1928	Guy's

1929	Guy's

1930	St Thomas's

1931	St Thomas's

1932	St Thomas's

1933	Barts

1934	Barts

1935	Guy's

1936	

1937	Guy's

1938	

1939	London

1940	

1941	

1942	

1943	

1944	

1945	

1946	

1947	Guy's

1948	Barts

1949	Barts

1950	

1951	

1952	London

1953	London

1954	St Mary's

1955	London

1956	Guy's

1957	Guy's

1958	Guy's

1959	St Mary's

1960	

1961	St Mary's

1962	St Mary's

1963	St Thomas's

1964	Guy's

1965	

1966	Guy's

1967	Guy's

1968	Guy's

1969	Guy's

1970	Guy's

1971	Guy's

1972	Guy's

1973	Guy's

1974	Guy's

1975	Barts

1976	Barts

1977	Westminster

1978	Westminster

1979	Westminster

1980	King's

1981	

1982	St Thomas's

1983	St Thomas's

1984	

1985	

1986	Guy's

1987	

1988	

1989	

1990	St Mary's

1991	St Mary's

1992	St Mary's

1993	St Mary's

1994	St Mary's

1995	Barts

1996	Barts and the London

1997	Barts and the London

1998	Barts and the London

1999	Barts and the London

2000	Barts and the London

2001	Barts and the London

2002	Barts and the London

2003	Barts and the London

2004    ICSM

2005    ICSM

2006    ICSM

2007    ICSM

2008    ICSM

2009    ICSM

2010    ICSM

2011    ICSM

2012    ICSM

2013    ICSM

2014    ICSM

2015    ICSM

2016    GKT (King's College)

2017    St George's

2018    The Royal Veterinary College

2019    St George's

2021    St George's

See also
 United Hospitals
 United Hospitals RFC
 United Hospitals Lawn Tennis Club

References

External links
UL Athletics
LUCA

Sports clubs established in 1867
United Hospitals sports clubs
Athletics clubs in England
1867 establishments in England